A branch of the Telshe Yeshiva, the Yeshiva of Telshe Alumni is  located in the Hudson Hill section of Riverdale, a neighborhood of the Bronx in New York City. It was founded in the early 1980s by Rabbi Avraham Ausband, a grandson of Rabbi Avraham Yitzchak Bloch, the Telzer Rav; by Rabbi Yaakov Reisman, a son-in-law of Telzer Rosh Yeshiva, Rabbi Mordechai Gifter; and by a talmid (Heb: student) of Rabbi Mordechai Gifter, Rabbi Yosef Chaim Libersohn, who came from Argentina for this purpose. The Yeshiva, with an enrollment of approximately two hundred, is currently headed by Harav Ausband Shlita.

The Yeshiva building, located at West 249th Street and Independence Avenue, across the street from Wave Hill, formerly housed the Manhattan Hebrew High School until it ceased operations at the end of the 1980–81 school year. The building at 640 West 249th Street was originally constructed around 1929 as a mansion for Anthony Campagna, a prominent real estate developer.

Learning style
The method of Talmudic study at the Yeshiva is based on the Rabbi Boruch Ber Lebowitz style of the Brisker method which is known for its hair-splitting "chilukim" (conceptual Talmudic distinctions) that are often hard to grasp unless one dwells on it for many hours. This style of learning can potentially greatly limit the number of blatt in the Talmud that will be studied during each semester. The Rosh Yeshiva, referred to as Rebbi by his students, delivers a daily Gemara Shiur, with a follow-up Shiur, called huddle by the students, after evening services. Students will then spend hours engrossed in analyzing the shiur to fully understand the Lomdus. The Yeshiva has a reputation for being one of the premier American yeshivas, in part due to its intensive and rigorous schedule, but also because of the carefully selected students, who are big "masmidim".

Magidei shiur
The maggidei shiur in the Yeshiva of Telshe Alumni are of the highest caliber. Rabbi Fromowitz is a ninth grade (machlaka alef, as it is called in Telz) maggid shiur. His main focus in shiur is to introduce the bochurim to the learning style of Brisk and lomdus in general. The tenth grade or Machlaka Beis Magid Shiur is Rabbi Avraham Swerdloff who learnt in Yeshivas Beis HaTalmud in his younger years. His brother Rabbi Elya Chaim Swerdloff is currently Rosh HaYeshiva in Paterson, New Jersey. R' Avraham Swerdloff often says torah from R' Nochum Partzovitz. The dean, Rabbi Ausband, gives the shiur for the second through fourth years.

References

Education in the Bronx
Lithuanian-American culture in New York City
Lithuanian-Jewish culture in New York (state)
Orthodox yeshivas in New York City
Riverdale, Bronx
Jews and Judaism in the Bronx